Máté Tóth (born 22 January 1991 in Budapest) is a Hungarian football player who plays for Vasas SC. From 2012 Augustus played for REAC Budapest.

Career 
Starting out with Budapest outfit III. Kerületi TUE, he moved on to Sheffield United's link club Ferencvárosi TC and then made a switch to their arch rivals Újpest FC. Máté's talents then saw him transferred to Italian side Empoli F.C., but he failed to settle and switched back to his home land in July with Győri. Moment Club is REAC (Rákospalotai Egyettértés Atlétikai Club, Budapest ) - middle defender.

At 188 cm he is an imposing prospect but also blessed with all the qualities of a modern-day defender. The Hungary under 19 International is an A.C. Milan supporter, and lists Rossoneri stalwart Alessandro Nesta as his idol. Tottenham Hotspur F.C. are also said to be keen to have a look at Máté, but Steve Rowley brokered a deal first.

References
http://www.eto.hu/

1991 births
Living people
Hungarian footballers
Győri ETO FC players
Rákospalotai EAC footballers
FC Hradec Králové players
Vasas SC players
BKV Előre SC footballers
Soproni VSE players
Nemzeti Bajnokság I players
Hungarian expatriate footballers
Expatriate footballers in Italy
Expatriate footballers in the Czech Republic
Hungarian expatriate sportspeople in Italy
Hungarian expatriate sportspeople in the Czech Republic
Association football central defenders
Footballers from Budapest